The A. V. Peters House aka the Peters-Liston-Wintermeier House, located in Eugene, Oregon, United States, is a house listed on the National Register of Historic Places. The house was built circa 1870 for merchant Andrew Vincent Peters and his wife Mary Elizabeth "Lizzy" (Shaw) Peters on the southeast corner of 10th and Pearl streets (661 Pearl Street was the original address), and moved to its current location in 1912. A -story 1890s carriage house was also moved onto the property at about the same time. Considered one of Oregon's finest examples of the Rural Gothic Style, the house was built using a design from a pattern book by Henry W. Cleaveland published in 1856. Another pattern book, Woodward's National Architect, published in 1869, was also used as a reference for some of the decorative elements of the house. The house features board and batten siding, scrollwork balcony detailing, and bracketed eaves supporting the steeply pitched roof.

The house was nominated for National Register of Historic Places listing by its owner in March 1980, and it was listed on the Register in October of that year.

See also
National Register of Historic Places listings in Lane County, Oregon

References

External links
Historic images of the Peters House from the University of Oregon digital archives

1860s architecture in the United States
1869 establishments in Oregon
Carpenter Gothic architecture in Oregon
Carpenter Gothic houses in the United States
Houses completed in 1869
Houses on the National Register of Historic Places in Eugene, Oregon